|}

This is a list of Legislative Council results for the Victorian 1979 state election. 22 of the 44 seats were contested.

Results by province

Ballarat 

 This seat was won by Labor in a 1978 by-election, but is recorded as a Liberal party hold.

Bendigo

Boronia

Central Highlands

Chelsea

Doutta Galla

East Yarra 

 Preferences were not distributed.

Geelong

Gippsland

Higinbotham

Melbourne

Melbourne North 

 Preferences were not distributed.

Melbourne West 

 Preferences were not distributed.

Monash

North Eastern

North Western

Nunawading

South Eastern

Templestowe

Thomastown

Waverley

Western 

 Preferences were not distributed.

See also 

 1979 Victorian state election
 Members of the Victorian Legislative Council, 1979–1982

References 

Results of Victorian state elections
1970s in Victoria (Australia)